He Xin (born 24 July 1996), also known by the Western name Elsa He, is a Chinese ice hockey player and member of the Chinese national ice hockey team, currently playing in the Zhenskaya Hockey League (ZhHL) with the KRS Vanke Rays. She played in the Canadian Women's Hockey League (CWHL) with the Vanke Rays during the 2017–18 season.

He represented China in the women's ice hockey tournament at the 2022 Winter Olympics in Beijing.

International career
He represented China at the Division I Group B tournaments of the IIHF Women's World Championship in 2014, 2015, 2016, 2017, 2018, and 2019, and at the Winter Universiades in 2015 and 2017. She won a silver medal in the women's ice hockey tournament at the 2017 Asian Winter Games, a gold medal at the 2014 IIHF Women's Challenge Cup of Asia, and a bronze medal with the China 2 team at the 2012 IIHF Women's Challenge Cup of Asia.

As a junior player with the Chinese national under-18 team, she participated in the Division I Qualification tournaments of the IIHF U18 Women's World Championship in 2012, 2013, and 2014. At the 2014 tournament, she served as team captain and was selected as the best player on the team by the coaches.

References

External links

1996 births
Living people
Asian Games medalists in ice hockey
Asian Games silver medalists for China
Chinese women's ice hockey forwards
Ice hockey players at the 2017 Asian Winter Games
Ice hockey players at the 2022 Winter Olympics
Olympic ice hockey players of China
People from Harbin
Vanke Rays players
Medalists at the 2017 Asian Winter Games